1953 in professional wrestling describes the year's events in the world of professional wrestling.

List of notable promotions 
Only one promotion held notable shows in 1953.

Calendar of notable shows

Notable events
July 30  The , Japan's first professional wrestling promotion, was created.
Empresa Mexicana de Lucha Libre (EMLL) joined the National Wrestling Alliance (NWA) representing Mexico in the Alliance.

Championship changes

EMLL

NWA

Debuts
Debut date uncertain:
Black Gordman
George Cannon
Joe Blanchard
Lou Albano
Mario Milano
Mark Lewin
Mitsu Arakawa
Pampero Firpo
Pepper Gomez
Peter Maivia
Rod Trongard
Stan Stasiak
Tojo Yamamoto
February 28  Wilbur Snyder
August 20  Irma González

Births
Date of birth uncertain:
Joe Lightfoot
January 25  The Honky Tonk Man
February 5  Takashi Ishikawa
February 13  Akio Sato
February 28  Ricky Steamboat
March 5  Dennis Coralluzzo (died in 2001) 
March 22  Buffalo Jim Barrier (died in 2008) 
April 3  Russ Francis
April 5  Salman Hashimikov
April 14  John Ayers (died in 1995) 
May 10  Tito Santana
May 18  Tiger Conway Jr. 
June 30  Hombre Bala(died in 2018) 
July 3   Steve O 
July 10  Billy Jack Haynes
July 10  Zoogz Rift (died in 2011) 
July 11:
Leon Spinks (died in 2021) 
Caveman Broda (died in 2022) 
July 20  Angel of Death(died in 2007)
August 5  Stan Lane
August 11: 
Hulk Hogan
Franco Columbo 
August 13  Sue Green
August 14  Gran Markus Jr.
August 18  Chief Jay Eagle
August 22  Paul Ellering
August 28  Joel Goodhart
September 1  Rocco Rock(died in 2002)
September 4  Kengo Kimura
September 15  Adrian Adonis (died in 1988) 
September 29  Warren Cromartie
December 13  Brad Rheingans
December 14  Fuerza Guerrera
December 24  Ricky Knight
December 28  Tatsumi Fujinami
December 30  Bill Kazmaier

Deaths
May 29  Man Mountain Dean (61)
June 13  Yakov Kozalchik (50)

References

 
professional wrestling